Por is a village in the Vayk Municipality of the Vayots Dzor Province of Armenia. It has a 19th-century church and a medieval cemetery.

References

External links 
 
 
 

Populated places in Vayots Dzor Province